Hydrophorinae is a subfamily of flies in the family Dolichopodidae. Several studies have found evidence that the subfamily in its current sense is polyphyletic.

Genera 
 Tribe Hydrophorini Lioy, 1864
Abatetia Miller, 1945
Anahydrophorus Becker, 1917
Aphrosylopsis Lamb, 1909
Coracocephalus Mik, 1892
Diostracus Loew, 1861
Lagodechia Negrobov & Zurikov, 1996
Ozmena Özdikmen, 2010
Sphyrotarsus Mik, 1874
Eucoryphus Mik, 1869
Helichochaetus Parent, 1933
Hydatostega Philippi, 1865
Hydrophorus Fallén, 1823
Liancalomima Stackelberg, 1931
Liancalus Loew, 1857
Melanderia Aldrich, 1922
Oedematopiella Naglis, 2011
Oedematopus Van Duzee, 1929
Orthoceratium Schrank, 1803
Paraliancalus Parent, 1938
Paraliptus Bezzi, 1923
Rhynchoschizus Dyte, 1980
Scellus Loew, 1857
Scorpiurus Parent, 1933
 Tribe Aphrosylini Aldrich, 1905
Acymatopus Takagi, 1965
Aphrosylus Haliday in Walker, 1851
Cemocarus Meuffels & Grootaert, 1984
Conchopus Takagi, 1965 (sometimes a synonym of Thambemyia)
Cymatopus Kertész, 1901
Paraphrosylus Becker, 1922
Teneriffa Becker, 1908
Thambemyia Oldroyd, 1956
Prothambemyia Masunaga, Saigusa & Grootaert, 2005
Thinolestris Grootert & Meuffels, 1988
 Tribe Epithalassiini Grichanov, 2008
Epithalassius Mik, 1891
Peodes Loew, 1857
 Tribe Hypocharassini Negrobov, 1981
Hypocharassus Mik, 1879
 Tribe Thinophilini Aldrich, 1905
Machaerium Haliday, 1832
Nanothinophilus Grootaert & Meuffels, 1998
Paralleloneurum Becker, 1902
Thinophilus Wahlberg, 1844
Parathinophilus Parent, 1932
Schoenophilus Mik, 1878
 Minjerribah Bickel, 2019

The following genera are part of the Eurynogaster complex, a monophyletic clade of flies endemic to Hawaii:
Adachia Evenhuis, 2005
Arciellia Evenhuis, 2005
Elmoia Evenhuis, 2005
Eurynogaster Van Duzee, 1933
Major Evenhuis, 2005
Sigmatineurum Parent, 1938
Sweziella Van Duzee, 1933
Uropachys Parent, 1935

References 

 
Dolichopodidae subfamilies